Gilbertiodendron is a genus of legume in the family Fabaceae. It consists of about 25 species of tree native to tropical Africa. Members of this genus were formerly considered to be in the genus Macrolobium but that genus is now restricted to species growing in tropical America. It is closely related to Pellegriniodendron.

Species
Gilbertiodendron includes the following species:
 Gilbertiodendron bilineatum
 Gilbertiodendron brachystegioides
 Gilbertiodendron dewevrei
 Gilbertiodendron diphyllum (Harms) Estrella & Devesa
 Gilbertiodendron grandiflorum
 Gilbertiodendron grandistipulatum
 Gilbertiodendron klainei
 Gilbertiodendron mayombense
 Gilbertiodendron ogoouense
 Gilbertiodendron pachyanthum
 Gilbertiodendron preussii
 Gilbertiodendron robynsianum
 Gilbertiodendron splendidum

References

 
Fabaceae genera